Tritones Vallarta M Fútbol Club is a football club that plays in the Liga Premier de México – Serie A. It is based in Puerto Vallarta and Bahía de Banderas, Mexico.

History
At the end of July 2021, it was reported about that a new soccer team would be located on the Mexican Pacific coast, without knowing the name or the city where it would be located, although it was mentioned that it would be led by Manuel Naya Barba. On July 30, it was officially announced that the new team will be called Tritones Vallarta M.F.C. and would be based in Puerto Vallarta, Jalisco. The team was created with the aim of forming a club that achieves identity in the city and its metropolitan area due to the absence of a representative club, in addition, the idea of seeking to reach the Liga de Expansión MX in a period of two years. 

Following the announcement of its creation, the club announced its first players: Julián Barajas; Sergio Rodríguez; Kevyn Montaño; César Landa; Alan Jaramillo; José Coronel and Bryan Álvarez.

The team played its first official game on September 18, 2021, in the game Vallarta defeated Mineros de Fresnillo F.C. 0–1 and Julián Barajas scored the first goal in the team's history.

Stadium
Ciudad del Deporte San José del Valle is a sports complex located in Bahía de Banderas, Nayarit, Mexico. It has a soccer stadium which has the capacity to host 4,000 people. However, the club's board plans to build its own stadium in Puerto Vallarta in a period of approximately three years.

Players

Current squad

Managers 
  Manuel Naya Barba (2021)
  Ulises Sánchez (2021–2022)
  Hugo Norberto Castillo (2022–)

References

Football clubs in Jalisco
Football clubs in Nayarit
Association football clubs established in 2021
2021 establishments in Mexico
Liga Premier de México
Puerto Vallarta